War and Peace is the second album by the American musician Syd Straw, released in 1996. Straw had been without a record label for four years prior to signing with Capricorn Records. The album title jokingly refers to War and Peace'''s almost 60-minute running time.

The first single was "Love, and the Lack of It".

Production
The album was produced by Straw. She recorded it, in two weeks, in Springfield, Missouri, where she was backed by the cult band the Skeletons. The sessions were paid for by Straw's manager boyfriend.

Many of the songs are about Straw's divorce and past relationships. "Million Miles" was cowritten with Johnette Napolitano. "Static" was originally an instrumental track, composed by Jeff Tweedy. "Almost as Blue" is dedicated to Kurt Cobain.

Critical receptionTrouser Press wrote that "Straw's vocals are tremendous throughout, and the album has a tougher tone musically than the overly glossy Surprise." The Atlanta Journal-Constitution deemed the album "a resilient cycle of country-rock songs about hopes, longings and the memories of complicated relationships." The Dayton Daily News concluded that "her infectious roots rock melodies are surprisingly upbeat, given the subject matter, and her rich voice—capable of fierce passion or a soft country lilt—is simply beyond compare."Stereo Review determined that "it's her intelligent lyrics and soaring choruses that make War and Peace a standout—the way she plays the victim/victor personas off each other." The Hartford Courant praised the Skeletons, writing that "Straw has just the right twang and snap to back her solid, affecting songs." The St. Louis Post-Dispatch labeled the album "a fair-to-middlin' collection of pop dirges and country-rock tunes on which her voice veers from adequate to lovely." The New York Times stated that "songs settle in between country rock and folk rock, with well-turned melodies and steady-strummed guitars ... Singing about heartache, Ms. Straw cuts self-pity with determined resilience."

AllMusic called the album "a jangly-guitar, singer/songwriter folk-rock feast and a glimpse into an apparently tortured soul." The Waterloo Region Record'' listed it as the second best album of 1996.

Track listing

References

1996 albums
Capricorn Records albums
Syd Straw albums